Stevens v. Gladding, 58 U.S. 447 (1854), was a United States Supreme Court case in which the Court held the copyright of a work is not attached to the physical copperplate used to print the work, so purchasing the copperplate does not purchase the copyright.

It also applied a principle from English law that courts of equity could not award penalties and concluded that copyright infringement damages categorically could not be awarded by equity, as distinguished from legal actions under common law. This meant that copyright holders would be required to file separate lawsuits for injunctions against the continued printing of works created by them (equity) and for requesting retroactive payment from infringers (law). That procedural requirement remained in place until the federal courts merged the law and equity dockets in 1938.

This case is closely related to Stephens v. Cady.

References

External links
 
 

1854 in United States case law
United States copyright case law
United States Supreme Court cases
United States Supreme Court cases of the Taney Court